The 2013 Open GDF Suez de Cagnes-sur-Mer Alpes-Maritimes was a professional tennis tournament played on outdoor clay courts. It was the sixteenth edition of the tournament which was part of the 2013 ITF Women's Circuit, offering a total of $100,000 in prize money. It took place in Cagnes-sur-Mer, France, on 6–12 May 2013.

WTA entrants

Seeds 

 1 Rankings as of 29 April 2013

Other entrants 
The following players received wildcards into the singles main draw:
  Caroline Garcia
  Myrtille Georges
  Sesil Karatantcheva
  Virginie Razzano

The following players received entry from the qualifying draw:
  Vera Dushevina
  Irina Ramialison
  Anne Schäfer
  Daniela Seguel

The following player received entry into the singles main draw as a lucky loser:
  Maryna Zanevska

Champions

Singles 

  Caroline Garcia def.  Maryna Zanevska 6–0, 4–6, 6–3

Doubles 

  Vania King /  Arantxa Rus def.  Catalina Castaño /  Teliana Pereira 4–6, 7–5, [10–8]

External links 

 2013 Open GDF Suez de Cagnes-sur-Mer Alpes-Maritimes at ITFtennis.com
 Official website

Open GDF Suez de Cagnes-sur-Mer Alpes-Maritimes
Open de Cagnes-sur-Mer
May 2013 sports events in France
2013 in French tennis